Dielectric heating, also known as electronic heating, radio frequency heating, and high-frequency heating, is the process in which a radio frequency (RF) alternating electric field, or radio wave or microwave electromagnetic radiation heats a dielectric material. At higher frequencies, this heating is caused by molecular dipole rotation within the dielectric.

Mechanism 

Molecular rotation occurs in materials containing polar molecules having an electrical dipole moment, with the consequence that they will align themselves in an electromagnetic field. If the field is oscillating, as it is in an electromagnetic wave or in a rapidly oscillating electric field, these molecules rotate continuously by aligning with it. This is called dipole rotation, or dipolar polarisation. As the field alternates, the molecules reverse direction. Rotating molecules push, pull, and collide with other molecules (through electrical forces), distributing the energy to adjacent molecules and atoms in the material. The process of energy transfer from the source to the sample is a form of radiative heating.

Temperature is related to the average kinetic energy (energy of motion) of the atoms or molecules in a material, so agitating the molecules in this way increases the temperature of the material. Thus, dipole rotation is a mechanism by which energy in the form of electromagnetic radiation can raise the temperature of an object. There are also many other mechanisms by which this conversion occurs.

Dipole rotation is the mechanism normally referred to as dielectric heating, and is most widely observable in the microwave oven where it operates most effectively on liquid water, and also, but much less so, on fats and sugars. This is because fats and sugar molecules are far less polar than water molecules, and thus less affected by the forces generated by the alternating electromagnetic fields. Outside of cooking, the effect can be used generally to heat solids, liquids, or gases, provided they contain some electric dipoles.

Dielectric heating involves the heating of electrically insulating materials by dielectric loss. A changing electric field across the material causes energy to be dissipated as the molecules attempt to line up with the continuously changing electric field. This changing electric field may be caused by an electromagnetic wave propagating in free space (as in a microwave oven), or it may be caused by a rapidly alternating electric field inside a capacitor. In the latter case, there is no freely-propagating electromagnetic wave, and the changing electric field may be seen as analogous to the electric component of an antenna near field. In this case, although the heating is accomplished by changing the electric field inside the capacitive cavity at radio-frequency (RF) frequencies, no actual radio waves are either generated or absorbed. In this sense, the effect is the direct electrical analog of magnetic induction heating, which is also near-field effect (thus not involving radio waves).

Frequencies in the range of 10–100 MHz are necessary to cause dielectric heating, although higher frequencies work equally well or better, and in some materials (especially liquids) lower frequencies also have significant heating effects, often due to more unusual mechanisms. For example, in conductive liquids such as salt water, ion-drag causes heating, as charged ions are "dragged" more slowly back and forth in the liquid under influence of the electric field, striking liquid molecules in the process and transferring kinetic energy to them, which is eventually translated into molecular vibrations and thus into thermal energy.

Dielectric heating at low frequencies, as a near-field effect, requires a distance from electromagnetic radiator to absorber of less than  ≈  of a wavelength. It is thus a contact process or near-contact process, since it usually sandwiches the material to be heated (usually a non-metal) between metal plates taking the place of the dielectric in what is effectively a very large capacitor. However, actual electrical contact is not necessary for heating a dielectric inside a capacitor, as the electric fields that form inside a capacitor subjected to a voltage do not require electrical contact of the capacitor plates with the (non-conducting) dielectric material between the plates. Because lower frequency electrical fields penetrate non-conductive materials far more deeply than do microwaves, heating pockets of water and organisms deep inside dry materials like wood, it can be used to rapidly heat and prepare many non-electrically conducting food and agricultural items, so long as they fit between the capacitor plates.

At very high frequencies, the wavelength of the electromagnetic field becomes shorter than the distance between the metal walls of the heating cavity, or than the dimensions of the walls themselves. This is the case inside a microwave oven. In such cases, conventional far-field electromagnetic waves form (the cavity no longer acts as a pure capacitor, but rather as an antenna), and are absorbed to cause heating, but the dipole-rotation mechanism of heat deposition remains the same. However, microwaves are not efficient at causing the heating effects of low frequency fields that depend on slower molecular motion, such as those caused by ion-drag.

Power 
Dielectric heating must be distinguished from Joule heating of conductive media, which is caused by induced electric currents in the media. For dielectric heating, the generated power density per volume is given by:

where ω is the angular frequency of the exciting radiation, εr″ is the imaginary part of the complex relative permittivity of the absorbing material, ε0 is the permittivity of free space and E the electric field strength.  The imaginary part of the (frequency-dependent) relative permittivity is a measure for the ability of a dielectric material to convert electromagnetic field energy into heat, also called dielectric loss. (The real part of the permittivity is the normal effect of capacitance and results in non-dissipative reactive power.)

If the conductivity σ of the material is small, or the frequency is high, such that  (with ), then Joule heating is low, and dielectric heating is the dominant mechanism of loss of energy from the electromagnetic field into the medium.

Penetration 
Microwave frequencies penetrate conductive materials, including semi-solid substances like meat and living tissue. The penetration essentially stops where all the penetrating microwave energy has been converted to heat in the tissue. Microwave ovens used to heat food are not set to the frequency for optimal absorption by water. If they were, then the piece of food or liquid in question would absorb all microwave radiation in its outer layer, leading to a cool, unheated centre and a superheated surface.  Instead, the frequency selected allows energy to penetrate deeper into the heated food. The frequency of a household microwave oven is 2.45 GHz, while the frequency for optimal absorbency by water is around 10 GHz.

Radio-frequency heating 

The use of high-frequency electric fields for heating dielectric materials had been proposed in the 1930s. For example,  (application by Bell Telephone Laboratories, dated 1937) states:"This invention relates to heating systems for dielectric materials and the object of the invention is to heat such materials uniformly and substantially simultaneously throughout their mass. It has been proposed therefore to heat such materials simultaneously throughout their mass by means of the dielectric loss produced in them when they are subjected to a high voltage, high frequency field."This patent proposed radio frequency (RF) heating at 10 to 20 megahertz (wavelength 15 to 30 meters). Such wavelengths were far longer than the cavity used, and thus made use of near-field effects and not electromagnetic waves. (Commercial microwave ovens use wavelengths only 1% as long.)

In agriculture, RF dielectric heating has been widely tested and is increasingly used as a way to kill pests in certain food crops after harvest, such as walnuts still in the shell. Because RF heating can heat foods more uniformly than is the case with microwave heating, RF heating holds promise as a way to process foods quickly.

In medicine, the RF heating of body tissues, called diathermy, is used for muscle therapy Heating to higher temperatures, called hyperthermia therapy, is used to kill cancer and tumor tissue.

RF heating is used in the wood industry to cure glues used in plywood manufacturing, fingerjointing, and furniture construction.  RF heating can also be used to speed up drying lumber.

Microwave heating

Microwave heating, as distinct from RF heating, is a sub-category of dielectric heating at frequencies above 100 MHz, where an electromagnetic wave can be launched from a small dimension emitter and guided through space to the target. Modern microwave ovens make use of electromagnetic waves with electric fields of much higher frequency and shorter wavelength than RF heaters. Typical domestic microwave ovens operate at 2.45 GHz, but 915 MHz ovens also exist. This means that the wavelengths employed in microwave heating are 0.1 cm to 10 cm. This provides for highly efficient, but less penetrative, dielectric heating.

Although a capacitor-like set of plates can be used at microwave frequencies, they are not necessary, since the microwaves are already present as far field type EM radiation, and their absorption does not require the same proximity to a small antenna as does RF heating. The material to be heated (a non-metal) can therefore simply be placed in the path of the waves, and heating takes place in a non-contact process which does not require capacitative conductive plates.

Microwave volumetric heating

Microwave volumetric heating is a commercially available method of heating liquids, suspensions, or solids in a continuous flow on an industrial scale. This is advantageous in commercial applications where increased shelf-life can be achieved, with increased microbial kill at temperatures  lower than when using conventional heating systems.

Applications of microwave volumetric heating include:
 Pasteurization
 Flash pasteurization
 Microwave chemistry
 Sterilization
 Food preservation
 Biofuel production

Food application
In drying of foods, dielectric heating is usually combined with conventional heating. It may be used to preheat the feed to a hot-air drier. By raising the temperature of the feed quickly and causing moisture to move to the surface, it can decrease the overall drying time. Dielectric heating may be applied part-way through the drying cycle, when the food enters the falling rate period. This can boost the rate of drying. If dielectric heating is applied near the end of hot-air drying it can also shorten the drying time significantly and hence increase the throughput of the drier. It is more usual to use dielectric heating in the later stages of drying. One of the major applications of RF heating is in the postbaking of biscuits. The objectives in baking biscuits are to produce a product of the right size, shape, color, and moisture content. In a conventional oven, reducing the moisture content to the desired level can take up a large part of the total baking time. The application of RF heating can shorten the baking time. The oven is set to produce biscuits of the right size, shape, and color, but the RF heating is used to remove the remaining moisture, without excessive heating of the already dry sections of the biscuit. The capacity of an oven can be increased by more than 50% by the use of RF heating. Postbaking by RF heating has also been applied to breakfast cereals and cereal-based baby foods.

Food quality is maximized and better retained using electromagnetic energy than conventional heating. Conventional heating results in large disparity in temperature and longer processing times which can cause overprocessing on the food surface and impairment of the overall quality of the product. Electromagnetic energy can achieve higher processing temperatures in shorter times, therefore, more nutritional and sensory properties are conserved.

See also 
 Dielectric welding
 Specific absorption rate
 Electrosurgery, which requires direct joule heating of tissue, and thus directly transmitted high frequency currents

References

External links 

 
 
  – Method and apparatus for heating dielectric materials

Electric and magnetic fields in matter
Heating
Medical equipment
Electromagnetism
Food processing